Man's Best Friend is singer-songwriter Livingston Taylor's sixth album, and fifth original album, released in 1980.

Record World called the single "First Time Love" an "upbeat ballad of innocent romance."

Track listing
"Ready, Set, Go" — (Jeff Baxter, Taylor, David Wofert)
"Dance With Me" — (John Hall, Joanna Hall)
"First Time Love" — (Pat Alger, Peter Kaminsky)
"Sunshine Girl" — (John Manchester, Taylor)
"You Don't Have To Choose" — (Jeff Baxter, Taylor)
"Dancing in the Street" — (William "Mickey" Stevenson, Marvin Gaye, Ivy Hunter)
"Out Of This World" — (Maggie Taylor, Taylor)
"Face Like Dog" — (John Manchester, Taylor)
"Pajamas" — (Maggie Taylor, Taylor)
"Marie" — (Randy Newman)

Personnel
 Livingston Taylor — Vocals, background vocals, guitars
 Jeff Baxter — Guitars
 Larry Carlton — Guitars
 Steve Cropper — Guitars
 Paulinho Da Costa — Percussion
 Scott Edwards – Bass
 Victor Feldman — Percussion
 Tom Funderbunk — Background vocals
 Ed Greene — Drums
 Howard Kaylan — Background vocals
 Tom Kelly — Background vocals
 Russ Kunkel — Drums
 Don Henley — Background vocals
 Jeff Porcaro — Drums
 Rick Shlosser — Drums
 Neil Stubenhaus – Bass
 Carla Thomas — Background vocals
 Mark Volman — Background vocals

Charts
Singles

References

1980 albums
Livingston Taylor albums
Albums produced by John Boylan (record producer)
Epic Records albums